Lew Porter (February 4, 1892, New York City – January 29, 1956, Los Angeles) was an American composer and songwriter, contributing to the soundtracks of 72 films.

Selected filmography
 Paroled from the Big House (1938)
 Gun Code (1940)
 Pioneer Days (1940)

References

External links

1892 births
1956 deaths
Songwriters from New York (state)
Musicians from New York City
20th-century American composers